The Game of Life is a 1922 British silent historical film directed by G. B. Samuelson and starring Isobel Elsom, Lillian Hall-Davis and Dorothy Minto. It was made at Isleworth Studios.

Cast
 Isobel Elsom as Alice Fletcher  
 Lillian Hall-Davis as Rose Wallingford  
 Dorothy Minto as Betsy Rudd  
 Campbell Gullan as Edward Travers  
 Tom Reynolds as Jim Cobbles  
 James Lindsay as Reggie Walker  
 Allan Aynesworth as John  
 Hubert Carter as Marcus Benjamin  
 Wyndham Guise as Abel Fletcher  
 Frederick Lewis as Richard Wallington  
 C. Tilson-Chowne as Richard Travers  
 Mickey Brantford as Nipper  
 Mrs. Henry Lytton as Queen of Hearts

References

Bibliography
 Low, Rachael. The History of the British Film 1918-1929. George Allen & Unwin, 1971.

External links
 

1922 films
1920s historical films
British historical films
British silent feature films
1920s English-language films
Films directed by G. B. Samuelson
Films shot at Isleworth Studios
Films set in the 19th century
Films set in England
British black-and-white films
1920s British films